Tres vidas distintas, is a 1969 Mexican telenovela produced by Televisa and originally transmitted by Telesistema Mexicano.

Cast 
Raúl Boxer
Eusebia Cosme
César del Campo
Elizabeth Dupeyrón

References

External links 

Mexican telenovelas
Televisa telenovelas
Spanish-language telenovelas
1968 telenovelas
1968 Mexican television series debuts
1968 Mexican television series endings